Nicolò Coccon (10 August 1826 – 4 August 1903) was an Italian composer, conductor, organist and teacher from Venice.

Life 
Born in Venice he studied with Fabio Ermagora, a pupil of Bonaventura Furlanetto.

In 1856 he was appointed organist and vice Maestro of the Cappella Marciana at San Marco's Basilica in Venice. Coccon succeeded Antonio Buzzolla when he retired in 1871. He was teacher of counterpoint at the Liceo Musicale Benedetto Marcello (1882–1897).

Coccon left the position of Maestro in 1894 for the conflicts with his vice Giovanni Tebaldini promoter of the Cecilian reform.

Compositions

Sacred music 

 8 Requiem:
 Requiem per l'Arciduca l'Austria Federico (1850)
 Messa di Requiem a quattro con orchestra e soli (1879)
 30 Masses
 Messa in fa a 4 voci e orchestra (1871)
 Piccola Messa in re a 4 voci ed orchestra (1875)
 3 Messe annuali d'obbligo pel S. Natale (1875, 1877, 1879)
 Messa per la Cappella di S.S. Andrea e Ambrogio a Genova (1869)
 5 Salmi per la Cappella di S.S. Andrea e Ambrogio a Genova (1869)
 several unpublished works

Operas 
 Manasse in Babilonia, (Venezia, orfanotrofio dei Gesuati, 15 marzo 1877);
 I due orangotani, operetta (Venezia, orfanotrofio dei Gesuati, 17 apr.ile 1879);
 Saul, dramma sacro in tre atti (Spello, Collegio Rossi, 10 febbraio 1884);
 Uggero il Danese (unpublished);
 Zaira (unpublished).

Compositions for band 

 Pensiero funebre per grande orchestra a Daniele Manin (1868);
 Barcarola, per banda e coro a 4 (1847);
 Inno a Carlo Goldoni;
 Sinfonia Umberto, a Umberto I of Italy.

Sources 
De Angelis, Alberto: L'Italia musicale d'oggi, dizionario dei musicisti (1918)

External links
 

1826 births
1903 deaths
19th-century classical composers
19th-century Italian composers
19th-century Italian male musicians
Cappella Marciana composers
Cappella Marciana maestri
Italian classical composers
Italian male classical composers
19th-century musicologists